General elections were held in Denmark on 8 February 2005. Prime Minister Anders Fogh Rasmussen's Venstre remained the largest party in the Folketing and his governing coalition with the Conservative People's Party remained intact, with the Danish People's Party providing the parliamentary support needed for the minority government. The Danish Social Liberal Party made the biggest gains of any party, although it remained outside the governing group of parties. The elections marked the second time in a row that the Social Democrats were not the largest party in parliament, a change from most of the 20th century. The Social Democrats lost five seats and leader Mogens Lykketoft resigned immediately after the elections. Voter turnout was 85% in Denmark proper, 73% in the Faroe Islands and 59% in Greenland.

Background
Prior to the SARS pandemic in 2003 and with Boxing Day tsunami in December 2004, Prime Minister Rasmussen called the elections on 18 January. Rasmussen still had almost a year left in his term, but he said that the country wanted to call the election before municipal elections in November. His reasoning was that he wanted a clear mandate for the municipal and county government restructuring that his government was implementing.

In the previous elections in 2001, the governing coalition of Venstre and the Conservative People's Party had won 94 of the 175 seats together with the supporting Danish People's Party.

Electoral system
This was the last election in which the counties were used as constituencies.

Campaign
Venstre campaigned on their municipal restructuring plan, as well as a continuation of the "tax-freeze" and tight immigration requirements. They also promised to see 60,000 jobs created during a second term.

The largest opposition party, the Social Democrats focused on employment, which they claim has decreased under the current government.

The Danish People's Party, which supported the Venstre–Conservative coalition, criticized the "tax-freeze" but agreed, conditionally, to support it for another parliamentary term. They also wanted increasingly tough immigration restrictions.

Results
63 out of the 179 members of the new Folketing were newly elected. Although women made up 38% of the total, several women held prominent positions, notably Pia Kjærsgaard, leader of the third largest party, the Danish People's Party. Marianne Jelved (leader of the Danish Social Liberal Party), Connie Hedegaard (Minister of the Environment), Pernille Rosenkrantz-Theil (front figure of Enhedslisten) and Helle Thorning-Schmidt (later elected as leader of Social Democrats) were other important woman in the parliament. A couple of parties, including the Social Democrats were holding leadership races, which might have been won by women. 9 of the top 20 candidates, in terms of personal votes, were women.

Aftermath
Following the elections, Prime Minister Anders Fogh Rasmussen reformed his liberal-conservative cabinet as the Cabinet of Anders Fogh Rasmussen II with parliamentary support from Danish People's Party.

See also
List of members of the Folketing, 2005–2007

References

Further reading

External links
Official info from Folketinget website
Angus Reid Consultants - Election Tracker

Elections in Denmark
Denmark
Parliamentary election
Denmark